The 2020-2021 agrarian strike in Peru refers to a series of protests that initially took place in the department of Ica, since November 30, 2020, by farmers who reported being victims of mistreatment and poor working conditions. They were joined by farmers from the department of La Libertad. The workers requested the repeal of the Agrarian Promotion Law, whose validity had been extended the previous year, in the Government of President Martín Vizcarra, until December 31, 2031. The protesters were heard by the Council of Ministers, who in conversations with Congress, after several days approved Bill No. 5759 that repealed Law No. 27360. Thus, on the fifth day of the agricultural strike, The protesters released the Panamericana Sur highway. The protests left two dead. On December 21, a day after the parliamentarians in the Congress of the Republic failed to reach an agreement to approve the new agrarian law, the protesters took up the blockade of the Panamericana Sur highway. The agricultural unions announced that it will be officially developed A national agricultural strike since December 29, 2020. Since the restart of the strike, twelve deaths have been registered, all in the department of La Libertad. On January 17, the last protest related to the agrarian strike was registered, by protesters demanding justice for the deceased.

See also
 2020 Peruvian protests

References

2020 in Peru
2020 protests
Labour disputes in Peru
2021 in Peru
2021 protests
2020 labor disputes and strikes
2021 labor disputes and strikes